The 1978 Argentina rugby union tour of Britain, Ireland and Italy was a series of nine matches played by the Argentina national rugby union team in September and October 1978.

Six of the nine matches were played in England, with the tourists going on to play one match each in Wales, Ireland and Italy. The tour featured the first ever test match between Argentina and Italy.

Argentina won five matches, lost three and drew one. The draw came against England, although England did not award full international caps for the fixture.

The tour captain, Hugo Porta, played all nine games, scored 94 of the team's 157 points on tour and, according to Rothmans Rugby Yearbook, "established himself as one of the world's great players" on the tour.

Touring squad 
Team Manager: Ángel Guastella

Full back
 Martín Sansot (Pueyrredón – Buenos Aires)
Three-quarters
 Marcelo Campo (Old Georgian)
 Adolfo Cappelletti (Banco Nación)
 Marcelo Loffreda (San Isidro Club)
 Rafael Madero (San Isidro Club)
 Alejandro Puccio (C.A. San Isidro)
 Javier Trucco (Universitario B.A.)
 Eduardo Sanguinetti (Universitario B.A.)

Half-backs
 Alejandro Cerioni (Pueyrredón)
 Alejandro Cubelli (Belgrano A.C.)
 Javier Escalante (Duendes
 Tomás Landajo (Pueyrredón)
 Hugo Porta (Banco Nación)
 Alfredo Soares Gache (San Isidro Club)
Forwards
 Alejandro Iachetti (Hindú)
 Hugo Nicola (Curupaytí)
 Ricardo Passaglia (La Tablada)
 Guillermo Paz (Alumni)
 Tomás Petersen (San Isidro Club)
 Topo Rodriguez (Tala)
 Ronaldo Seaton (Atlético del Rosario)
 Carlos Serrano (Hindú)
  Héctor Silva (Los Tilos)
 Gabriel Travaglini (C.A. San Isidro)
 Rodolfo Ventura (Newman)

The matches 
Complete list of matches played by Argentina:

Southern Counties 

Southern Counties: I.Gale. Clive Rees, B.Reynolds, D.Course-, R.Ellis Jones; J.Wright e I.George; G.Sharpe, R.Jackson, J.Coock, J.Mawle, John Orwin, Paul Rendall, A.Jenkins, Gary Pearce.
Argentina: M.Sansot; A.Puccio, R.Madero, M.Loffreda, A.Cappelletti; H.Porta (capt.), R.Landajo; C.Serreno, H.Silva, T.Petersen; A.Iachetti, G.Travaglini; H.Nicola; R..Seaton, A.Cerioni.

London Division

London Division: K.M.Bushell; R.O.Demming; N.R.French, Clive Woodward, Derek Wyatt; N.J.Preston, M.R.Conner; T.C.Claston, P.d'A.Keith-Roach (capt.) A.J.Cutter, N.D.Mantell, Maurice Colclough, A.C.Alexander, R.J.Mordell, Andy Ripley.
Argentina: M.Sansot; A.Puccio, M.Loffreda, R.Madero, A.Cappelletti; H.Porta (capt.), R.Landajo; H.Silva, T.Pe¬tersen, G.Paz; G.Travaglini, A.Iachetti; H.Nicola, A.Cubelli, A.Cerioni.

Northern Division

 North of England: D.Boyd; Peter Squires, Tony Bond, W.Lyon, Mike Slemen; John Horton, Malcolm Young; Fran Cotton; K.Pacey, J.Bell, Bill Beaumont (capt.), J.Buttler, Peter Dixon, P.Moss, K.Higgins. 
Argentina: M.Sansot; M.Campo, J.Trueco, R.Madero, A.Cappelletti; H.Porta (capt.), R.Landajo; T.Petersen, C.Serrano, H.Silva; A.Iachetti, R.Passaglia; H.Nicola, R.Sea¬ton, E.Rodríguez.

North Midlands

 North Midlands: P.J.Mumford.C.Perry, A.Watson-Jones, M.K.Swain, M.A.Hall; Les Cusworth, P.C.Bullock; T.F.Corless, G.N.J.Cox, J.J.Moore, B.Aire, N.J.Bekewell, J.C.White, T.Clarke, D.Nutt.
Argentina: M.Sansot; M.Campo, M.Lofreda, R.Madero, A.Cappelletti; H.Porta (capt.), A.Soares Gache; G.Paz, C.Serrano, G.Travaglini; R.Passaglia, A.Iachetti; H.Nicola, R.Seaton, A.Cerioni.

The English Students 

 English Students: Marcus Rose; J.Basnett, A.Harrower, Clive Woodward, P.Asquith; 1.Wilkins, M.Conner; S.Wilkes, M.Howe, J.Doubleday, Paul Ackford, Steve Bainbridge, Toby Allchurch, Nick Jeavons, Peter Polledri.
Argentina: E.Sanguinetti; M.Campo, J.Escalante, R.Madero, A.Cappelletti; H.Porta (capt.), R.Landajo; G.Paz, G.Travaglini, H.Silva; R.Passaglia, A.Iachetti; H.Nicola, A.Cubelli, A.Cerioni.

England

Wales "B"

 Wales "B": I.Walsh; E.Rees, N.Hutchings, P.Morgan, R.Ellis¬Jones; D.Barry, G.Williams; D.Jones, G.Davies, D.Lewis, R.Moriarty, S.Sutton, G.Williams, Ch.Seldon, P.Ringer. 
Argentina: M.Sansot; M.Campo, M.Loffreda, R.Madero, A.Cappelletti; H.Porta (capt.), A.Soares Gache; T.Peter¬sen, C.Serrano, G, Travaglini; R.Passaglia, A.lachetti; H.Nicola, A.Cubelli, A.Cerioni.

Leinster 

 Leinster: F.Ennis; T.Kennedy, P.Andrucetti, P.Me Naughton, A.Me Lennan; M.Quinn, J.Moloney (capt.); P.Orr, J.Cantrell, M.Fitzpatrick, W.Duggan, E.D'Raffertty, F.Slattery, S.Deering, M.Gibson.
Argentina: M.Sansot; M.Campo, J.Trucco, R.Madero, A.Cappelletti; H.Porta (capt.), Landajo; H.Silva, T.Petersen, G.Travaglini; R.Passaglia, A.lachetti; H.Nicola, A.Cubelli, A.Cerioni.

Italy 

Italy: 15.Rocco Caligiuri, 14.Massimo Mascioletti, 13.Nello Francescato, 12.Rino Francescato, 11.Serafino Ghizzoni, 10.Loredano Zuin, 9.Angelo Visentin, 8.Elio de Anna, 7.Fiorenzo Blessano, 6.Paolo Mariani, 5.Adriano Fedrigo, 4.Fulvio di Carlo, 3.Ambrogio Bona (capT.), 2.Claudio Robazza, 1.Anacleto Altigieri – Replacement: Narciso Zanella

Argentina 15.Eduardo Sanguinetti, 14.Martin Sansot, 13.Javier Escalante, 12.Rafael Madero, 11.Marcelo Campo, 10.Hugo Porta (cap), 9.Alfredo Soares Gache, 8.Gabriel Travaglini, 7.Tomas Petersen, 6.Carlos Serrano, 5.Ricardo Passaglia, 4.Alejandro Iachetti, 3.Alejandro Cerioni, 2.Alejandro Cubelli, 1.Rodolfo Ventura – Replacement: Adolfo Cappelletti, Hugo Nicola

Bibliography

References

1978
1978
1978
1978
1978
Argentina–Italy relations
rugby
1978–79 in English rugby union
1978–79 in Welsh rugby union
1978–79 in Italian rugby union
1978–79 in Irish rugby union
History of rugby union matches between Argentina and England
History of rugby union matches between Argentina and Ireland